Cinc Sentits is a Michelin two-starred restaurant in Barcelona, Catalonia, Spain run by self-taught Chef-Owner Jordi Artal and Maitre-Owner Amèlia Artal.  The restaurant's name comes from its goal of stimulating each of the five taste sensations (sweetness, bitterness, sourness, saltiness and umami).

Specialties
The restaurant's specialties are:
Cured and seared mackerel
Sea Bass, Smoked Sauce, Crispy Onion and Zucchini Noodles
Sangria without sangria

See also
Catalan cuisine

External links

References

Michelin Guide starred restaurants in Spain
Restaurants in Barcelona
Catalan cuisine
Restaurants in Catalonia